A national treasure is a shared cultural asset, or a rare cultural object valued by a nation.

National Treasure can also refer to:

 National Treasure (film series), Disney film series
 National Treasure (film), first film of the series
 National Treasure (American TV series), a television series continuation of the franchise
National Treasure (British TV series), British television drama
National Treasure (Chinese TV series), Chinese TV series
 National Treasures – The Complete Singles, Manic Street Preachers album